Seydou Koné may refer to:

 Alpha Blondy (born 1953), born Seydou Koné, Ivorian reggae singer
 Seydou Koné (footballer, born 1983), Ivorian football striker
 Seydou Koné (footballer, born 1987), Ivorian football centre-back